The mixed 10 metre air rifle team competition at the 2018 Asian Games in Jakarta, Indonesia took place on 19 August at the Jakabaring International Shooting Range.

Schedule
All times are Western Indonesia Time (UTC+07:00)

Records

Results

Qualification

Final

References

Results

External links
Schedule

Mixed 10 metre air rifle team